Dambou Traoré (born 27 November 1977) is a French former professional footballer who played as a midfielder. He played on the professional level in Ligue 2 for US Créteil-Lusitanos and earned two caps with the Mali national team in 2000 and 2001.

References

1977 births
Living people
Association football midfielders
Malian footballers
French footballers
Mali international footballers
Footballers from Paris
Ligue 2 players
US Créteil-Lusitanos players
Red Star F.C. players
US Ivry players
ES Viry-Châtillon players
21st-century Malian people